Golden Zephyr is an attraction at Paradise Gardens Park in Disney California Adventure Park built by D. H. Morgan Manufacturing. Themed to the Buck Rogers and Flash Gordon style rocket ships, it takes park guests on a relaxing trip. Unlike its cousins Dumbo and the Astro Orbiter next door in Disneyland, the Golden Zephyr rockets are controlled by centripetal motion over Paradise Bay and can not be automatically controlled to go up and down.

The Golden Zephyr's design comes from the Harry Traver Circle-Swing rides of the early 20th century, specifically the Aerostat / Strat-O-Stat ride that operated at Riverview Park in Chicago. In designing the ride, Disney engineers visited Pleasure Beach in Blackpool, England to examine the Captive Flying Machines, a similar, but much larger, ride designed by Sir Hiram Maxim, and which has operated there since 1904.

Neither this attraction, nor Jumpin' Jellyfish were removed or changed as part of the billion-dollar expansion.

References

External links

Walt Disney Parks and Resorts attractions
Disney California Adventure
Paradise Pier
Paradise Gardens Park
Amusement rides introduced in 2001
2001 establishments in California